Trichrous is a genus of beetles in the family Cerambycidae, containing the following species:

 Trichrous basalis (White, 1853)
 Trichrous bicolor (Sallé, 1856)
 Trichrous brevicornis Zayas, 1975
 Trichrous dimidiatipennis (Chevrolat, 1838)
 Trichrous fisheri Monné & Giesbert, 1992
 Trichrous irroratus (Olivier, 1795)
 Trichrous jaegeri Chevrolat, 1858
 Trichrous jamaicensis Chevrolat, 1858
 Trichrous lineolatus (White, 1853)
 Trichrous nigripes Fisher, 1942
 Trichrous pilipennis Chevrolat, 1862
 Trichrous prasinus Cazier & Lacey, 1952
 Trichrous violaceipennis Fisher, 1942
 Trichrous vittatus Fisher, 1932

References

Heteropsini